The canton of Longué-Jumelles is an administrative division of the Maine-et-Loire department, in western France. Its borders were modified at the French canton reorganisation which came into effect in March 2015. Its seat is in Longué-Jumelles.

It consists of the following communes:

Allonnes 
Blou
Brain-sur-Allonnes
La Breille-les-Pins
Courléon
Gennes-Val-de-Loire (partly)
La Lande-Chasles
Longué-Jumelles
Mouliherne
Neuillé
Saint-Clément-des-Levées
Saint-Philbert-du-Peuple
Varennes-sur-Loire
Vernantes
Vernoil-le-Fourrier
Villebernier
Vivy

References

Cantons of Maine-et-Loire